Agloves (pronounced “a-gloves”) is an American, privately held winter touchscreen glove company that makes gloves which work on all capacitive touchscreens. The company is based in Boulder, Colorado. Agloves were launched on September 29, 2010. Jennifer Spencer, inventor of the gloves, currently serves as the company’s CEO and President. The gloves incorporate silver-nylon yarn to conduct the body's bioelectricity to the touchscreen device.
Agloves have won several awards including Best New Product and Best New Company from 2011 Stevie Awards; and the Innovation Quotient Award from the Boulder County Business Report.

As of May 10, 2013, Agloves closed their business for personal reasons.

In August 2014 AGloves, its rights and patents were purchased by NY based Prolific Innovations LLC which now continues to bring the AGlove to the marketplace.

References 

Manufacturing companies based in Boulder, Colorado
Gloves
American companies established in 2010
2010 establishments in Colorado